Virginia's 92nd House of Delegates district elects one of 100 seats in the Virginia House of Delegates, the lower house of the state's bicameral legislature. District 92 in Hampton has been represented by Democrat Jeion Ward since 2004. In the 2017 election, Ward faced a primary challenge from Michael Harris.

District officeholders

References

Virginia House of Delegates districts
Hampton, Virginia